Ken Jacobs (born May 25, 1933 in Brooklyn, New York) is an American experimental filmmaker. His style often involves the use of found footage which he edits and manipulates. He has also directed films using his own footage. 

Ken Jacobs directed Blonde Cobra in 1963. This short film stars Jack Smith who directed his own Flaming Creatures the same year. In 1969 he directed Tom, Tom, the Piper's Son (1969, USA), in which he took the original 1905 short film and manipulated the footage to recontextualize it. This is considered an important first example of deconstruction in film. The film was admitted to the National Film Registry in 2007. His Star Spangled to Death (2004, USA) is a nearly seven-hour film consisting largely of found footage. Jacobs began compiling the archival footage in the 1950s and the film took years to complete. 

Jacobs taught at the Cinema Department at Harpur College at Binghamton University from 1969 to 2002. His son Azazel Jacobs is also a filmmaker.

In the 1990s, Jacobs began working with John Zorn and experimented with a stroboscopic effect, digital video, and 3D effects.

Selected filmography

 Little Stabs at Happiness (1960), 14:57 min, color, sound, 16 mm film on video.
 Blonde Cobra (1963), 33 min, color and b&w, sound, 16 mm film on video.
 Window (1964) 
 Lisa and Joey in Connecticut (1965), 21:59 min, color, silent, Super 8mm film on video.
 Tom, Tom, The Piper's Son (1969), 133 min, color and b&w.
 Perfect Film (1986)
 Opening the Nineteenth Century: 1896 (1991)
 The Georgetown Loop (1996), 11 min, b&w, silent.
 Circling Zero: We See Absence (2002), 114:38 min, color, sound.
 Star Spangled to Death (2004), 440 min, b&w and color, sound, DVD. Clip collection began in 1956.
 Nymph (2007), 2 min, color, silent.
 Gift of Fire: Nineteen (Obscure) Frames that Changed the World (2007), 27:30 min, anaglyph 3-D color, surround sound.
 The Scenic Route (2008), 25 min, color and b&w, sound.
 Seeking the Monkey King (2011), 39:42 min, color, 5.1 surround sound, HD video.
 Joys of Waiting for the Broadway Bus (2013), 4–part series, enhanced 3D film digital slides.
 A Primer in Sky Socialism (2013), color 3D film.

Awards and accolades
He is a recipient of the 1994 American Film Institute's Maya Deren Award. In 2012 he received a Creative Capital  Moving Image grant award. In 2014 he was named a United States Artists (USA) Fellow.

References

External links
Ken Jacobs' official website
EAI: Ken Jacobs Biography

Cinema and Critical Reflection A Conversation with Ken Jacobs and Family

1933 births
American experimental filmmakers
Film directors from New York (state)
Living people
Collage filmmakers
Binghamton University faculty